Théo Pellenard (born 4 March 1994) is a French professional footballer who plays as a left-back for  club Auxerre.

Club career
Born in Lille, Pellenard made his debut for Bordeaux on 12 December 2013 in the UEFA Europa League group stage against Maccabi Tel Aviv replacing Sessi D'Almeida after 75 minutes. He made his Ligue 1 debut on 15 December 2013 in a 2–1 home win against Valenciennes playing the full game as a left-back.

In August 2015, Pellenard joined Ligue 2 newcomers Paris FC on a one season loan-deal. He scored in his first match for the club against Brest.

On 31 January 2019, the last day of the 2018–19 winter transfer window, Pellenard moved to Bordeaux's league rivals Angers on a free transfer. He signed a 1.5-year contract. Pellenard eventually left Angers after his contract with the club expired in 2020.

On 28 October 2020, Pellenard joined Ligue 2 side Valenciennes on a one-year deal.

Career statistics

References

External links
 
 
 

1994 births
Living people
Footballers from Lille
French footballers
Association football fullbacks
France youth international footballers
Ligue 1 players
Ligue 2 players
Championnat National 2 players
Championnat National 3 players
Hyères FC players
UA Valettoise players
FC Girondins de Bordeaux players
Paris FC players
Angers SCO players
Valenciennes FC players
AJ Auxerre players